Süleyman Hilmi Tunahan, (1888 – 16 September 1959), was a 20th-century Islamic scholar born in the small Ottoman village of Ferhatlar, also known as Varatlar and today Delchevo in the Razgrad Province, Bulgaria. Süleyman later became a Sufi Master in the tradition of the Naqshbandi Order.

Biography 
Süleyman's father, Osman, was a hafız ("one who has memorized the whole Qur'an") and a renowned Islamic teacher of his time. Osman had finished his education in Istanbul before becoming a professor at the well-known Satirli Madrasah (theological school attached to a mosque) in Silistre. Süleyman's ancestors include Idris who was appointed by Mehmet II (r. 1451–81) as the "Tuna Khan". The young Süleyman was educated at Silistra Middle School and the Satirli Madrasah. Afterwards he went to Istanbul to finish his studies, enrolling in the Sahn Madrasah where he took lessons from Bafra born Ahmet Hamdi. He graduated in 1916 as valedictorian of his class then enrolled at the Süleymaniye Mosque Madrasah in Medresetü'l-Mütehassisin where he studied the tafsir (commentary on the Quran) and hadith (narrations concerning the words and deeds of Muhammad). Süleyman graduated again as valedictorian from Medresetü'l-Mütehassisin in 1919 and in the same year graduated from Medresetü'l-Kuzat law school, coming first in exams. On informing his father of this ranking he was told: "I didn't send you to Istanbul to go to hell", reminding him of Muhammad's saying: "Two out of three (unrighteous) judges will go to hell." Süleyman explained that his goal was not to become a judge but to learn both religious and common knowledge. He then began work as an Islamic teacher in Istanbul until its madrasahs were closed whereupon he was assigned to work as an Islamic preacher. For some time he preached Islamic sermons in Istanbul's large Ottoman era Selatin mosques such as Sultan Ahmed, Süleymaniye, Şehzâdebaşı, Yeni and Piyale Pasha mosques. While working as an Islamic preacher he also taught Muslim children, first in his own home then in madrasahs after they received government permission to reopen in 1946–1947. Süleyman also started to teach the principles of Islam. Many of his students graduated from the madrasas and received permission from the Diyanet İşleri Başkanlığı (Presidency of Religious Affairs) to work as muftis (officials learned in Islamic law who is in charge of Islamic affairs for a province or district), imams (prayer leaders), muezzins (individuals who call five times a day to announce prayers), Islamic preachers and madrasah teachers.

Süleyman's practice of Islam followed the Hanafi (school of Islamic law), while his firm belief in God stemmed from the Maturidi school of Islam. He told his students that: "They should hold tight to the creed of Ahl al-Sunnah wa'l Jama'ah". Süleyman died in Kısıklı, Üsküdar, Istanbul on 16 September 1959. He is buried in Karacaahmet Cemetery.

Süleyman’s silsila 

His Naqshbandiyyah silsila goes back to Khwaja Shah Ahmed Sā‘īd Fāruqī Mujaddidī.

References

External links 
 United American Muslim Org

Hanafis
Maturidis
Turkish educators
1959 deaths
1888 births
Ottoman Sunni Muslims
People from Razgrad Province
Turkish Muslims
20th-century Muslim scholars of Islam
Ottoman Sufis
Turkish Sufis
Bulgarian Turks in Turkey